Albert Harry Goldman (April 15, 1927 – March 28, 1994) was an American academic and author.

Goldman wrote about the culture and personalities of the American music industry both in books and as a contributor to magazines. He is best known for his bestselling book on Lenny Bruce and his controversial biographies of Elvis Presley and John Lennon.

Early life
Albert Goldman was born in Dormont, Pennsylvania, and raised in Mount Lebanon, Pennsylvania.

Academic career
Goldman briefly studied theater at the Carnegie Institute of Technology before serving in the U.S. Navy from 1945 to 1946. He earned a master's degree in English from the University of Chicago in 1950; under the chancellery of Robert Maynard Hutchins, students who were not enrolled in the generalist "Chicago Plan" undergraduate degree program were designated as master's students and received the higher degree after five years of study.

Upon matriculating in the English doctoral program at Columbia University, Goldman began to teach literature courses at several institutions in New York City, including the City College of New York, Hunter College, Baruch College, Brooklyn College, the School of Visual Arts and the Columbia University School of General Studies. During this period, he first became acquainted with Lenny Bruce through his wife, Florence Singer, who introduced her husband to New York's vibrant jazz scene before going on to "re-raise [Goldman] as a hip Brooklyn Jew" along with her family and friends throughout his doctoral studies, effectively planting the seeds for his later interest in popular culture. Following studies under Lionel Trilling and Jacques Barzun, he completed his Ph.D. in 1961 with a dissertation on Thomas de Quincey. Goldman argued that de Quincey had plagiarized most of his acclaimed journalism from lesser-known writers; the dissertation was subsequently published as a monograph (The Mine and the Mint: Sources for the Writings of Thomas DeQuincey) by Southern Illinois University Press in 1965. He also co-edited Wagner on Music and Drama (1964), a compendium of Richard Wagner's theoretical writings.

After taking his doctorate, Goldman remained affiliated with Columbia, where he was an adjunct associate professor of English and comparative literature from 1963 to 1972; among his course offerings was the University's first class on popular culture. A close friend of Philip Roth, Goldman may have influenced the characterization of libidinous academic David Kepesh, notably showcased by Roth in such works as The Breast (1972) and The Professor of Desire (1977).

In the 1960s, Goldman began to publish a diverse array of reportage and cultural criticism (running the gamut from travel writing on the Rhine to reviews of classical music and popular music) in a variety of publications, including The Atlantic, The New Leader, Commentary, The New Republic, The New York Review of Books, The Nation, LIFE, New York, Vogue, Esquire, High Times and Penthouse. Many of his early writings on popular culture were collected in Freakshow: The RockSoul BluesJazzSickJew BlackHumorSexPopPsychoGig and Other Scenes from the Counter-Culture (1971), which also served as the textbook for the later iterations of his Columbia popular culture course.

Written work

Bestseller dealing with Lenny Bruce
Goldman's breakthrough success, Ladies and Gentlemen – Lenny Bruce!! (1974), won praise from the likes of Norman Mailer and Pauline Kael, who called the book "brilliant." The book was largely positive in its appraisal of Bruce's talent, though it was criticized by many of Bruce's friends for allegedly distorting his character and for claims that Bruce had had homosexual experiences.

Elvis Presley biography

Goldman's critical 1981 biography Elvis was much more controversial. In this book, Goldman drew on more than four years' research into Elvis Presley's life. But for many fans and some critics, his research was undermined by his intense personal dislike of Presley.

Goldman dismissed the performer as a plagiarist who never did anything of note after his first records at Sun Records, insisting that he was inferior as an artist to Little Richard and other contemporaries. He also portrayed Presley as nearly insane, using stories that some might see as innocuous (such as Presley taking his friends halfway across the country to buy them peanut-butter sandwiches) to "prove" that the singer had lost his grip on reality.

On the other hand, the book does include several newly discovered facts. For instance, in the course of his research, Goldman discovered that Presley's manager, Colonel Thomas Parker, was not a true Southerner, but instead a native of the Netherlands, and probably in the United States illegally. Parker had successfully covered this up to the degree that Presley himself allegedly never learned of it. (The book is harshest on Parker himself out of all the figures in Presley's life with whom it deals, with the probate attorney Blanchard E. Tual, "guardian ad litem" of Lisa Marie Presley in 1981, being identified as Goldman's primary informant on the subject of Parker as a manager.) Furthermore, the book critically deals with the singer's weight problems, his diet, his choice of performing costumes, and his sexual appetites and peculiarities. Goldman even suggests that Presley's promiscuity masked latent homosexuality. Discussing Presley's personal life, Goldman concludes: "Elvis was a pervert, a voyeur." Some critics found comments like these overly biased and judgmental. 
In his review of the book in the Village Voice, rock critic and Elvis Presley scholar Greil Marcus wrote: "The real significance of Goldman's 'Elvis' is its attempt at cultural genocide ... The torrents of hate that drive this book are unrelieved." He particularly objected to Goldman's constant slurs against Presley's background, including his characterization of Presley's parents as "the original Beverly Hillbillies" without bothering to include the explanatory context that the situation comedy was actually the story of suddenly rich innocents, as Presley's parents themselves were, who were trying to cope with the fear that even money and social access would never be enough to enable them to belong. "It is Goldman's purpose to entirely discredit Elvis Presley, the culture that produced him, and the culture he helped create – to altogether dismiss and condemn, in other words, not just Elvis Presley, but the white working-class South from which he came, and the pop world which emerged in his wake." However, Marcus also admits that Goldman has significantly shown that "Elvis Presley built his own world...where the promise was that every fear, pain, doubt, and wish could be washed away with money, sex, drugs, and the bought approval of yes-men..." He notes regretfully that it "as no book on Elvis Presley before it, ... has been taken seriously. Despite some partially negative or carping notices, the reviewing media have accepted the book as it presents itself—as the last book we will need about Elvis Presley."
In 2006, Blender called Elvis a "muckraking biography", stating that Goldman dealt with everything about Elvis Presley but his music.
Other critics liked the book. Jonathan Yardley of The Washington Post called it a "nasty book, written in spectacularly execrable prose, but the view of Presley that it expressed dovetailed in many instances with my own, and in spite of itself I found things in it to admire."
According to Rolling Stone, October 21, 1981, Elvis "is a poignant book, the result of Goldman's winning the trust and confidence of hundreds of sources, including many of Elvis' closest friends. It is also an intimate look at a side of Elvis that few even suspected existed. Many people will find some of the revelations unpleasant and view them as a needless and harmful invasion of privacy. Yet, such revelations comprise a truth about modern American heroism and success. The fact is that somehow inherent in Elvis' great fame as an American ideal and idol is a contradiction that was the seed of destruction."
Lamar Fike, the Presley insider and former member of the Memphis Mafia, who introduced Goldman to many of his sources, recalled: "The problem was Albert's personality. At first, he liked Elvis. But later, he started disliking him. And by the end of (writing) the book, I think he hated him. I said, 'Albert, you can't do this.' But I couldn't stop him."

Defending himself against his critics, Goldman told an interviewer: "People were scandalized by my use of humor and ridicule in [the Elvis biography]. Elvis was someone they were accustomed to taking in a very sentimental way. But I feel he was a figure of the most bizarre and grotesque character. . . . The humor is a mode of perception. Of making things vivid."

Article on Bruce Lee
In 1982, Goldman wrote a very unflattering article on actor Bruce Lee which was published in two parts by Penthouse in January–February 1983.

The Lives of John Lennon
Goldman's next biography arguably aroused even more controversy than the Elvis biography. In The Lives of John Lennon (1988), a product of years of research and hundreds of interviews with many of Lennon's friends, acquaintances, servants and musicians, Goldman juxtaposes Lennon's talents against his perceived neuroticism. The book reveals a very personal side of the musician who was prone to faults, such as anger, domestic violence (exemplified by an assistant's allegation that then-girlfriend Yoko Ono's 1968 miscarriage was triggered by a beating from Lennon), drug abuse (including longstanding addictions to cocaine and heroin), adultery, and indecisiveness, but who was also a generational leader. It deals with Lennon's childhood and the impact others had on the life of the sensitive little boy, among them his aunt, Mimi Smith, his father, Fred Lennon, and Johnny Dykins. Goldman implies that strong women ruined Lennon, starting with Smith, and that he was later being held prisoner by Ono (who may have encouraged their mutual heroin addiction as a way of controlling him and his vast fortune to her own ends).

Focusing on the mistakes Lennon made and mean things he did, Goldman made many controversial allegations, among them the charge that he may have had something to do with the sudden death of his friend Stuart Sutcliffe, an early member of The Beatles.  (Sources other than Goldman's book reported the cause of death as a brain hemorrhage.)  Goldman also says that Lennon had a sexual relationship with The Beatles' manager, Brian Epstein, whom Goldman characterizes as a dishonest, incompetent businessman who hid behind the image of a "gentleman". Half of the book covers the personality of Ono, who is portrayed in a very bad light. Goldman alleges that, among other things, she hated Paul McCartney, arranged for customs officials at a Tokyo airport to search carefully his luggage upon his arrival there eleven months before Lennon's death and to arrest him for smuggling marijuana, neglected her children, brainwashed Lennon and pulled him away from everyone who ever meant something to him. Goldman also alleged that the two carried on constant extramarital affairs throughout their marriage, with Ono involved in one during the summer of 1980. Goldman substantially revealed that no record exists of the phone calls Ono claims to have made to McCartney and Mimi Smith the night Lennon was murdered.

Concerning Goldman's account of Lennon's consumption of LSD, Lucy Sante, in The New York Review of Books, said: "Goldman's background research was either slovenly or nonexistent."

Peter Doggett writes in You Never Give Me Your Money: The Battle for the Soul of the Beatles that Goldman's book possessed many faults, but still managed to capture significant elements of Lennon's life.

Second book on Presley
In 1990, Goldman published a second book, entitled Elvis: The Last 24 Hours, on the circumstances and events of Presley's death, arguing that the singer had committed suicide. The book drew some attention for its sensational thesis but was largely ignored.

Last project in his career and death
Goldman died of a heart attack on March 28, 1994, while flying from Miami to London. He left unfinished a biography of Doors singer Jim Morrison.

Three years before his death, Penthouse published a long excerpt from his work-in-progress on Morrison. The excerpt focused on documents that Goldman claimed to have obtained from the Paris Police Prefecture regarding the minor police investigation that had been conducted in response to Morrison's wife Pamela Courson's notification that he had died suddenly at the apartment they were renting. According to Goldman, Courson provided a detailed account of the activities she and Morrison had done together throughout the day and night of Friday, July 2, 1971. They included setting up a movie projector and screening their Super 8 film home movies that they had made during a recent trip to Spain.

According to Goldman, Courson seemingly gave police the whole truth about the early-morning hours of Saturday, except that she carefully refrained from admitting that either of them had used narcotics. According to Goldman, she even admitted that Morrison had vomited blood extensively and she grabbed a series of pots from their kitchen to catch all of it, and police believed her claim that this had happened in the middle of the night without the deceased, age 27, being under the influence of narcotics or alcohol.

Goldman's biography of Morrison was never published, nor did a publication other than Penthouse refer to the alleged contents of Paris Police Prefecture documents related to Morrison and Courson. In an obituary in the Los Angeles Daily News, Phil Rosenthal said of Goldman's last project, "At the time of his death, he was picking over Jim Morrison's bones for yet another book."

In popular culture
U2 lead singer Bono referenced his disdain for Goldman in the song "God Part II" from the 1988 album Rattle and Hum:
"Don't believe in Goldman
His type [is] like a curse
Instant Karma's gonna get him
If I don't get him first"

Singer-satirist Mojo Nixon makes a scornful reference to Goldman in his 1989 single, "(619) 239-KING", which parodied the rumors that Presley was still alive by inviting the singer to call what was, at the time of release, a legitimate phone number.

Partial bibliography
Wagner on Music and Drama (1964; co-edited with Evert Sprinchorn)
The Mine and the Mint: Sources for the Writings of Thomas de Quincey (1965)
Freakshow;: The  gig and other scenes from the counter-culture (1971; republished as Freakshow : Misadventures in the Counterculture, 1959–1971, 2001) 
Ladies and Gentlemen – Lenny Bruce!! (1974)
Carnival in Rio (1978)
Grass Roots: Marijuana in America Today (1979)
Disco (1979)
Elvis (1981)
The Lives of John Lennon (1988)
Elvis: The Last 24 Hours (1990)
Sound Bites (1992)

References

External links
 The Lives of John Lennon – Reply by Albert Goldman - New York Review of Books
 Finding aid to Albert Goldman papers at Columbia University. Rare Book & Manuscript Library.
 

1927 births
1994 deaths
20th-century American biographers
20th-century American male writers
Brooklyn College faculty
Celebrity biographers
Jewish American academics
Jewish American writers
American male biographers
People from Dormont, Pennsylvania
20th-century American Jews